William Donald Brunson (March 20, 1970 – November 23, 2019) was an American Major League Baseball (MLB) pitcher for the Los Angeles Dodgers and Detroit Tigers. He pitched in 27 games during the 1998 and 1999 seasons.

He died on November 23, 2019, after suffering a heart attack while hiking at Big Bend National Park.

References

External links

1970 births
2019 deaths
People from Irving, Texas
Baseball players from Texas
Major League Baseball pitchers
Los Angeles Dodgers players
Detroit Tigers players
Sportspeople from New Braunfels, Texas
Philadelphia Phillies scouts
Texas State Bobcats baseball players
Eastfield Harvesters baseball players
Princeton Reds players
Charleston Wheelers players
Winston-Salem Spirits players
San Antonio Missions players
San Bernardino Spirit players
Albuquerque Dukes players
Toledo Mud Hens players
Sacramento River Cats players
Salt Lake Stingers players